In representation theory, a branch of mathematics, the theorem of the highest weight classifies the irreducible representations of a complex semisimple Lie algebra . There is a closely related theorem classifying the irreducible representations of a connected compact Lie group . The theorem states that there is a bijection

The difference between the two results is in the precise notion of "integral" in the definition of a dominant integral element. If  is simply connected, this distinction disappears.

The theorem was originally proved by Élie Cartan in his 1913 paper. The version of the theorem for a compact Lie group is due to Hermann Weyl. The theorem is one of the key pieces of representation theory of semisimple Lie algebras.

Statement

Lie algebra case 

Let  be a finite-dimensional semisimple complex Lie algebra with Cartan subalgebra . Let  be the associated root system. We then say that an element  is integral if 

is an integer for each root . Next, we choose a set  of positive roots and we say that an element  is dominant if  for all . An element  dominant integral if it is both dominant and integral.

The theorem of the highest weight then states:
If two finite-dimensional irreducible representations have the same highest weight, they are isomorphic.
For each dominant integral element , there exists a finite-dimensional irreducible representation with highest weight .

The most difficult part is the last one; the construction of a finite-dimensional irreducible representation with a prescribed highest weight.

The compact group case 

The theory then proceeds in much the same way as in the Lie algebra case, with one crucial difference: the notion of integrality is different. Specifically, we say that an element  is  analytically integral if 

is an integer whenever

Every analytically integral element is integral in the Lie algebra sense, but there may be integral elements in the Lie algebra sense that are not analytically integral. On the other hand, if  is simply connected, the notions of "integral" and "analytically integral" coincide.

Proofs 
There are at least four proofs:
Hermann Weyl's original proof from the compact group point of view, based on the Weyl character formula and the Peter–Weyl theorem. 
The theory of Verma modules contains the highest weight theorem. This is the approach taken in many standard textbooks (e.g., Humphreys and Part II of Hall).
The Borel–Weil–Bott theorem constructs an irreducible representation as the space of global sections of an ample line bundle; the highest weight theorem results as a consequence. (The approach uses a fair bit of algebraic geometry but yields a very quick proof.)
The invariant theoretic approach: one constructs irreducible representations as subrepresentations of a tensor power of the standard representations. This approach is essentially due to H. Weyl and works quite well for classical groups.

See also 
 Classifying finite-dimensional representations of Lie algebras
 Representation theory of a connected compact Lie group
 Weights in the representation theory of semisimple Lie algebras

Notes

References 
 
 
 
 .

Representation theory
Lie algebras
Theorems about algebras
Theorems in representation theory